Vicissitude is the third studio album by English electronic musician Maps. It was released in July 2013 under Mute Records. The single "A.M.A." features Norwegian singer-songwriter Susanne Sundfør.

Track list

Singles
 "A.M.A.": June 24, 2013

References

2013 albums
Maps (musician) albums
Mute Records albums